The Stirling Quartzite Formation is a geologic formation in the northern Mojave Desert of Inyo County, California and Nye County and Clark County, Nevada.

It can be seen in the Panamint Range and Funeral Mountains adjoining Death Valley within Death Valley National Park; and in the Spring Mountains in Clark County.

Geology
The formation underlies the Wood Canyon Formation.

It preserves fossils dating back to the Ediacaran period of the Neoproterozoic Era.

See also

 List of fossiliferous stratigraphic units in California
 List of fossiliferous stratigraphic units in Nevada

References

Ediacaran California
Ediacaran geology of Nevada
Quartzite formations
Geology of Inyo County, California
Natural history of the Mojave Desert
Death Valley National Park
Panamint Range
Geologic formations of California
Geologic formations of Nevada